Captain Nice is an American comedy TV series that ran from 9 January 1967 to 28 August 1967, Monday nights at 8:30 pm EST on NBC, opposite ABC's The Rat Patrol and CBS's The Lucy Show.  The show was an unsuccessful attempt to cash in on the 1966 smash hit ABC TV version of Batman. A similar series on CBS,  Mr. Terrific, also aired on Monday nights that season in the 8 pm EST time slot.

A single-issue comic book adaptation was published by Gold Key Comics in November 1967. Reruns of Captain Nice aired on Ha! (Comedy Central) in 1991.

Plot 
Riding the tide of the camp superhero craze of the 1960s, the show's premise involved police chemist Carter Nash (William Daniels), a mild-mannered mama's boy who discovered a secret formula that, when he drank it, transformed him in an explosive burst of smoke into Captain Nice.
 
Nash called himself "Captain Nice" in his first appearance when a bystander asked him who he was: his belt buckle was monogrammed "CN," and Nash later admitted, "It was all I could think of!" On that occasion the explosion that transformed him blew off most of his clothes, leaving him in long underwear and with the remnants of his shirt suggesting a cape.

Captain Nice didn't behave much differently from Carter. His costume consisted of white pajamas adorned with gold stars, red stripes on the pants, the words "Captain Nice" (initially misspelled "Captin" until a smaller 'A' was added) in blue across the chest, a red-white-and-blue belt with a gold buckle, and an over-sized red and blue cape, all lovingly sewn by his domineering mother who had basically cajoled Nash into his crime-fighting career.  In some episodes he wore his regular glasses as Captain Nice, but in others he wore a domino mask, but still wore his glasses over the mask.  Despite the kitschy garb, the very sight of Captain Nice somehow struck fear into the hearts of criminals.

His superpowers included superhuman strength, invulnerability and the ability to fly, although Nash had a great fear of heights, and his natural clumsiness increased whenever he drank his super serum.
 
Carter had a would-be girlfriend in the police department, meter maid Sgt. Candy Kane, although he seemed mostly oblivious to her obvious attentions.

Cast
William Daniels as Captain Nice / Carter Nash
Alice Ghostley as Mrs. Nash
Ann Prentiss as Sgt. Candy Kane
Liam Dunn as Mayor Finney	
Byron Foulger as Mr. Nash

Production 
The series was created by Buck Henry, who was a co-creator of the hit series Get Smart. The show's premise is similar to that of CBS's Mister Terrific, which preceded Captain Nice on Monday nights. 
 
Ann Prentiss, younger sister of actress Paula and sister-in-law of actor Richard Benjamin, played Candy.

Alice Ghostley (who was only three years Daniels' senior) played Carter's mother. She later won fame as the witch Esmerelda on Bewitched, and as neighbor Bernice on the comedy Designing Women.

Carter's father, whose face was never seen, was portrayed by one of the films' most prolific character actors, Byron Foulger. In a reverse of Foulger's ubiquity and familiarity in films, his appearances in this series generally found him hidden behind a newspaper and not making a sound.

Episode list

Home media
Captain Nice was released in Germany by Pidax film media Ltd (AL! VE) on Region 2 DVD on August 5, 2011 under the title Das Geheimnis der blauen Tropfen - Die komplette Serie. Audio is German language only, with no English language option. Episodes are reportedly heavily edited with some only running 14 minutes in length per episode.

References

External links 

 
 Captain Nice Program Intro at YouTube

1960s American sitcoms
1967 American television series debuts
1967 American television series endings
American superhero comedy television series
NBC original programming
Parody superheroes
Television series by CBS Studios
Television series created by Buck Henry